Tiarei is an associated commune on the island of Tahiti, in French Polynesia. It is the administrative centre of the commune of Hitiaa O Te Ra.

References

Towns and villages in Tahiti